Ethan Jones (born 4 April 1998) is an English footballer who plays for  side Hednesford Town, where he plays as a forward.

Club career 
Born in Dudley and educated at High Arcal School, Jones was in the youth ranks at Wolverhampton Wanderers before being released and joining Shrewsbury Town. After four years in Shrewsbury's youth system, he signed his first professional contract in October 2015, for two years with option for a third.

On 30 January 2016, he had his first call-up to the senior squad, remaining unused in an FA Cup fourth round 3–2 home win over Sheffield Wednesday. Jones made his first team and Football League debut on 8 May, the final day of the 2015–16 season, coming on as a 58th-minute substitute for Andy Mangan in a 3–0 League One loss away to Swindon Town.

In September 2016, he moved to National League side Tranmere Rovers on a youth loan running until January 2017. He was recalled following the sale of Andy Mangan to Tranmere on 4 November, before being sent out on loan again to Northern Premier League Premier Division side Stourbridge in February 2017 on an initial one-month deal. His loan deal was later extended to the end of the season, with Jones participating in the club's unsuccessful play-off attempt as they lost out to Spennymoor Town in the final. Shrewsbury opted not to extend Jones' contract on his return, and he left the club on the expiry of his contract in June 2017.

Following his release from Shrewsbury, Jones joined National League North side Southport on 15 June 2017. Later that year he left for a short stint at Halesowen Town, before joining Welsh Premier League side Newtown in January 2018.

On 1 February 2019, Jones joined Hednesford Town. On 9 March 2019, the club announced, that Jones had left the club.

In July 2019, Jones joined Halesowen Town, in November 2019 he then moved to Alvechurch.

On 19 December 2019, Jones rejoined Hednesford Town.

Career statistics

References

External links 

1998 births
Living people
Sportspeople from Dudley
English footballers
Shrewsbury Town F.C. players
Tranmere Rovers F.C. players
Stourbridge F.C. players
Southport F.C. players
Halesowen Town F.C. players
Newtown A.F.C. players
Hednesford Town F.C. players
Evesham United F.C. players
Alvechurch F.C. players
English Football League players
National League (English football) players
Northern Premier League players
Cymru Premier players
Association football forwards